Amarjit Singh (born 29 August 1970) is a British former male wrestler.

Wrestling career
Singh competed in the 1996 Summer Olympics where he finished in 13th place in the men's super-heavyweight division. He represented England and won a bronze medal in the 100kg+ super-heavyweight division, at the 1994 Commonwealth Games in Victoria, British Columbia, Canada. Eight years later, he competed in his home Commonwealth Games at the 2002 Commonwealth Games in Manchester.

Personal life
In April 2014, Singh was jailed for six-and-a-half years for possessing prohibited firearms and ammunition.

References

External links
 

1970 births
Living people
Olympic wrestlers of Great Britain
Wrestlers at the 1996 Summer Olympics
British male sport wrestlers
Commonwealth Games medallists in wrestling
Commonwealth Games bronze medallists for England
Wrestlers at the 1994 Commonwealth Games
Wrestlers at the 2002 Commonwealth Games
Medallists at the 1994 Commonwealth Games